Augustus Holmes Kenan (April 21, 1805 – June 2, 1870) was an American politician who served as the Confederate States Congress Representative from Georgia's 4th congressional district from 1862 to 1864. He was renowned for heroism in the Second Seminole War, leveraging his acclaim to win seats in both houses of the Georgia General Assembly. He was a delegate to the Georgia Secession Convention and was elected by that body, Deputy to the Provisional Congress of the Confederate States.

Biography
Augustus H. Kenan was born April 21, 1805, in Baldwin County, Georgia. He was a lawyer by trade; residing in Milledgeville and Baldwin County his entire life. He was renowned as an able criminal lawyer of his era. Kenan married Henrietta G. Alston but was later divorced from her and remarried to Sarah Barnes of Baldwin County. They had five children of the marriage: Thomas Holmes, Lewis Holmes, Michael Johnston, Owen Tom, and Livingston. Kenan served in the Georgia House of Representatives and state Senate. He represented Georgia in the Provisional Congress of the Confederate States from 1861 to 1862 and the 1st Confederate States Congress from 1862 to 1864, losing reelection to Clifford Anderson. Kenan died on June 2, 1870, and interred at Memory Hill Cemetery in Milledgeville, Georgia.

See also
 List of signers of the Georgia Ordinance of Secession

References

External links
 

1805 births
1870 deaths
19th-century American politicians
Burials at Memory Hill Cemetery
Confederate States of America senators
Deputies and delegates to the Provisional Congress of the Confederate States
Georgia (U.S. state) state senators
Members of the Confederate House of Representatives from Georgia (U.S. state)
Members of the Georgia House of Representatives
Signers of the Confederate States Constitution
Signers of the Provisional Constitution of the Confederate States
Signers of the Georgia Ordinance of Secession